Reza Seyed-Hosseini (October 15, 1926 – May 1, 2009) was a noted translator of French language works of literature into Persian.

Mehdi Mirza Mehdi Tehrani (currently professor of film studies at the University of Tehran faculty of Fine Arts  and film critic) The last of his students was in translation, entry writing and encyclopedia courses 1987 until 1992.

References

1926 births
2009 deaths
Iranian translators
20th-century translators